Anakin may refer to:

 A variant of the surname Annakin
 Doug Anakin (1930–2020), Canadian bobsleigh athlete
 Anakin Skywalker, later known as Darth Vader, a central character in the Star Wars franchise
 Anakin Solo, grandson of Darth Vader
 Anakin (given name)

See also
 Anakim, biblical giants